Dylan McLaughlin (born December 2, 1993) is an American actor. He has appeared in television series including ER and Bones as well the motion pictures Alice Upside Down, Georgia Rule, and Kicking & Screaming. He has also appeared as Benji in iCarly.

Personal life
McLaughlin was born in La Mesa, California. He began acting after being encouraged by his older brother who had also been a child actor. McLaughlin says he suffers from stage fright and because of this does not act on stage very often.

Awards
In 2008, McLaughlin was nominated for at the Young Artist Awards for Best Performance in a Feature Film-Supporting Young Actor - Comedy or Musical' for his performance in Georgia Rule and 'Best Performance in a TV Movie, Miniseries or Special-Leading Young Actor' for his performance in You've Got A Friend.

Filmography

Film

Television

References

External links

Dylan McLaughlin on Myspace

1993 births
American male film actors
American male television actors
Living people
People from La Mesa, California